The Podgoria Copou Monastery, dedicated to Ss. Athanasius and Cyrill, is a Romanian Orthodox monastery, located on Copou Hill neighborhood in Iași, Romania.

The church of the monastery was built by Moldavian Prince Vasile Lupu.

References

External links

 Churches and monasteries in Iași at Iași City Hall website

Romanian Orthodox churches in Iași
Romanian Orthodox monasteries of Iași County
Historic monuments in Iași County
Christian monasteries established in the 17th century
1638 establishments in Romania
17th-century architecture in Romania